Omari Glasgow (born 22 November 2003) is a Guyanese professional footballer who plays as a forward for MLS Next Pro club Chicago Fire II and the Guyanese national team.

Club career
On 24 March 2022 it was announced that Glasgow had signed for MLS Next Pro club Chicago Fire II, the reserve team of Chicago Fire FC of Major League Soccer. The deal was for an initial two years with a club option to extend through 2024. Prior to signing with Chicago, Glasgow was playing for Western Tigers FC in the GFF Elite League.He has recently announced that he will be joining Barcelona.

International career
He debuted internationally with the Guyanese U-17 team on 5 January 2019, in a 2019 CONCACAF U-17 Championship qualifying match held in the United States, in a 4–0 defeat to El Salvador. He also appeared in 2020 CONCACAF U-20 Championship qualifying.

On 30 March 2021, Glasgow made his senior debut, and scored his first goal for Guyana against Bahamas in a 4–0 victory.

International goals
Last updated 7 June 2022.

References

External links
MLS NEXT Pro profile
National Football Teams profile
 

Living people
2003 births
Guyanese footballers
Association football forwards
Guyana international footballers
Guyana under-20 international footballers
Guyana youth international footballers
Fruta Conquerors FC players
MLS Next Pro players
Chicago Fire FC II players
Expatriate soccer players in the United States
Guyanese expatriate footballers
Guyanese expatriate sportspeople in the United States
Sportspeople from Georgetown, Guyana